Albert Richards (13 August 1924 – 27 April 2003) was a New Zealand long-distance runner. He competed in the marathon at the 1956 Summer Olympics.

References

External links
 

1924 births
2003 deaths
Athletes (track and field) at the 1956 Summer Olympics
New Zealand male long-distance runners
New Zealand male marathon runners
Olympic athletes of New Zealand
Athletes from Christchurch